Shelter Islands is a group of small islands lying 0.5 km (0.3 miles) west of Winter Island in the Argentine Islands, Wilhelm Archipelago. They were charted and named by the British Graham Land Expedition (BGLE), 1934–37, under the leadership of John Rymill.

See also 
 List of Antarctic and sub-Antarctic islands

Islands of the Wilhelm Archipelago